Carlos Andrés Jacques Coelho (born 11 February 1982) is an Uruguayan footballer who plays for Boston River in the Uruguayan Segunda División, as a midfielder.

Career
Jacques began his senior career at Peñarol in 1999, moving to loan to Bella Vista in 2002 and being free in January 2003. He signed for Sant Julià in 2010 after several years in lower Uruguayan clubs and UE Sitges, a Spanish team belonging to the Catalan regional divisions.

References

External links

1982 births
Living people
Uruguayan people of French descent
People from Artigas Department
Uruguayan footballers
Peñarol players
C.A. Bella Vista players
Uruguayan expatriate footballers
Uruguayan expatriate sportspeople in Spain
Expatriate footballers in Spain
Expatriate footballers in Andorra
UE Sant Julià players
Association football midfielders